Peña Cebollera, Cebollera Vieja or pico de las Tres provincias is a mountain which is part of Sierra de Ayllón mountain range in Sistema Central system of mountain ranges. A tripoint related to the autonomous communities of Madrid, Castilla–La Mancha and Castile and León is located on this elevation. The height of this landform is 2,129 metres.

References 

Mountains of Spain
Sierra de Ayllón